Ted Turner is an American media mogul and philanthropist.

Ted Turner may also refer to:

 Ted Turner (guitarist) (born 1950), guitarist and vocalist
 Ted Turner (baseball) (1892–1958), Major League Baseball pitcher
 Ted Turner (footballer) (1921–1981), Australian rules footballer
 Teddy Turner (actor) (1917–1992), English actor

See also
Edward Turner (disambiguation)